The Harvard Oriental Series is a book series founded in 1891 by Charles Rockwell Lanman and Henry Clarke Warren. Lanman served as its inaugural editor (1891-1934) for the first 37 volumes. Other editors of the series include Walter Eugene Clark (1934-1950, volumes 38–44), Daniel Henry Holmes Ingalls (1950-1983, volumes 45–48) and Gary Tubb (1983-1990, volume 49).

Currently in its 93rd volume, the series is edited by Michael Witzel, the Wales Professor of Sanskrit in the Department of Sanskrit and Indian Studies at Harvard University, and distributed by the Harvard University Press. A subseries, Harvard Oriental Series Opera Minora, "aims at the swift publication of important materials that cannot be included in the mainly text-oriented Harvard Oriental Series."

Volumes of Main Series

Volumes of Opera Minora subseries

See also
Columbia University Indo-Iranian Series
Loeb Classical Library
Murty Classical Library of India

References

External links
 

Harvard University Press books
Orientalism
Series of books
Indology
Books about India